Paul Edward Ganus (born July 28, 1961) is an American actor. He is a native of Midland, Michigan.

Career
Ganus has guest starred on numerous television series, including Murder, She Wrote, Dallas, The Fresh Prince of Bel-Air, Las Vegas, Alias, Cold Case, House M.D., Veronica Mars, Family Guy, The O.C., CSI: Crime Scene Investigation, Nip/Tuck and Heroes.

He has also had small roles in such feature films as Lethal Weapon 3, The Mask of Zorro and Rumor Has It....

Ganus appeared in a recurring role of "Andy Johnson" on the soap opera The Bold and the Beautiful.

He also voiced several NPCs in the popular video game The Elder Scrolls V: Skyrim.

Sources

External links

1961 births
American male television actors
Living people
People from Midland, Michigan
American male voice actors